Animal's Run is a 2011 Argentine drama film written and directed by Nicolás Grosso. The film won the Jury Prize at the 2011 Buenos Aires International Independent Film Festival.

Plot
The closure of a factory produces a crisis for the owner, a father in the film who remains in the shadows, marking from there the fate of his two children, the other two main characters and protagonists: Valentine, the youngest, who lives humbly away from the family business; and Cándido, the elder, who seems better prepared for the power and violence game of business, even if it means harming his own family.

Cast
 Julián Tello
 Lautaro Vilo
 Gonzalo Martínez 
 Valeria Lois
 Ignacio Rogers
 Marcelo Pozzi
 Esteban Lamothe

References

External links
 

2011 films
2011 drama films
2010s Spanish-language films
Argentine drama films
2010s Argentine films